The long hundred, also known as the great hundred or twelfty, is the number 120 (in base-10 Arabic numerals) that was referred to as hund, hund-teontig, hundrað, hundrath, or hundred in Germanic languages prior to the 15th century, and is now known as one hundred twenty, or six score.

The long hundred was 120, but the long thousand was reckoned decimally as 10 long hundreds (1200).

English unit
The hundred was an English unit of measurement used in the production, sale and taxation of various items in the medieval kingdom of England. The value was often different from 100 units, mostly because of the continued medieval use of the Germanic long hundred of 120. The unit's use as a measure of weight is now described as a hundredweight.

The Latin edition of the Assize of Weights and Measures, one of the statutes of uncertain date from around 1300, describes hundreds of (red) herring (a long hundred of 120 fish), beeswax, sugar, pepper, cumin, and alum (" stone, each stone containing 8 pounds" or 108 Tower lbs.), coarse and woven linen, hemp canvas (a long hundred of 120 ells), and iron or horseshoes and shillings (a short hundred of 100 pieces). Later versions used the Troy or the avoirdupois pound in their reckonings instead and included hundreds of fresh herrings (a short hundred of 100 fish), cinnamon, nutmegs ( stone of 8 lb), and garlic ("15 ropes of 15 heads" or 225 heads).

History
The existence of a non-decimal base in the earliest traces of the Germanic languages is attested by the presence of glosses such as "tenty-wise" or "ten-count" to denote that certain numbers are to be understood as decimal. Such glosses would not be expected where decimal counting was usual. In the Gothic Bible, some marginalia glosses a five hundred in the text as being understood  ("tenty-wise"). Similar words are known in most other Germanic languages. Old Norse counted large numbers in twelves of tens, with its words "one hundred and eighty" meaning 200, "two hundred" meaning 240 and "thousand" meaning 1200. The word to signify 100 (a "short hundred") was originally 100, . The use of the long hundred in medieval England and Scotland is documented by Stevenson and Goodare although the latter notes that it was sometimes avoided by using numbers such as "seven score". The hundred of kippers is formed by six score fish and the hundred of hemp canvas and linen cloth is formed by six score ells, but the hundred of pounds, to be used in measuring bulk goods, is five times twenty, and the hundred of fresh herring is five score fish.

The reckoning by long hundreds waned as Arabic numerals which require the uniform base 10, spread throughout Europe during and after the 14th century.

In modern times, J. R. R. Tolkien's use of the long hundred system within The Lord of the Rings helped popularize the word eleventy in modern English, primarily as a colloquial word for an indefinitely large number.

See also
 Hundredweight
 Short hundred
 Gross

References

External links

Hundred on sizes.com

Imperial units
Numeral systems
English phrases
Units of amount